Bengt Bertil Blomgren (15 August 1923 – 4 April 2013) was a Swedish actor, film director and screenwriter, born in Stockholm.

Selected filmography
1997 - Tic Tac
1997 - Tre Kronor (TV series)
1997 - Rederiet (TV)
1995 - Pensionat Oskar
1994 - Den vite riddaren (TV)
1992 - Hassel – Botgörarna
1977 - Bröderna Lejonhjärta
1961 - Hällebäcks gård (also director)
1959 - Space Invasion of Lapland
 1959 -  Crime in Paradise 
1958 - Brink of Life
1958 - Laila
1958 - Line Six (also screenwriter and director)
1957 - The Halo Is Slipping 
1957 - Mästerdetektiven Blomkvist lever farligt
1956 - Det är aldrig för sent
1955 - Farligt löfte
1955 - Wild Birds
1955 -  The Dance Hall 
1954 - Karin Månsdotter
1954 - Dance in the Smoke (also director)
1953 - Hidden in the Fog
 1953 -  A Night in the Archipelago 
 1953 - The Chieftain of Göinge 
1952 - Encounter with Life 
1951 - Kvinnan bakom allt
1951 - In the Arms of the Sea 
1948 - Girl from the Mountain Village

External links

Obituary - Svenska Dagbladet (Swedish)

Swedish screenwriters
Swedish male screenwriters
Swedish film directors
1923 births
2013 deaths
20th-century Swedish male actors
Deaths from prostate cancer
Male actors from Stockholm
Deaths from cancer in Sweden